Pediculosis corporis is a cutaneous condition caused by body lice (specifically Pediculus humanus humanus) that lay their eggs in the seams of clothing.

Signs and symptoms
Body lice are a nuisance in themselves and cause intense itching. They are also vectors (transmitters) of other diseases and can spread epidemic typhus, trench fever, and louse-borne relapsing fever.

Risk factors
Body lice are spread through prolonged direct physical contact with a person who has them or through contact with articles such as clothing, beds, bed linens, or towels that have been in contact with an infested person. In the United States, body lice infestations are rare, typically found mainly in homeless transient populations who do not have access to bathing and regular changes of clean clothes. Infestation is unlikely to persist on anyone who bathes regularly and who has at least weekly access to freshly laundered clothing and bedding.

Although louse-borne (epidemic) typhus is no longer widespread, outbreaks of this disease still occur during times of war, civil unrest, natural or man-made disasters, and in prisons where people live together in unsanitary conditions. Louse-borne typhus still exists in places where climate, chronic poverty, and social customs or war and social upheaval prevent regular changes and laundering of clothing.

Pathophysiology
Body lice frequently lay their eggs on or near the seams of clothing. They must feed on blood and usually only move to the skin to feed. They exist worldwide and infest people of all races and can therefore spread rapidly under crowded living conditions where hygiene is poor (homeless, refugees, victims of war or natural disasters).

Treatment
A body lice infestation is treated by improving the personal hygiene of the infested person, including assuring a regular (at least weekly) change of clean clothes. Clothing, bedding, and towels used by the infested person should be laundered using hot water (at least ) and machine dried using the hot cycle. 

Sometimes the infested person also is treated with a pediculicide (a medicine that can kill lice); however, a pediculicide generally is not necessary if hygiene is maintained and items are laundered appropriately at least once a week. A pediculicide should be applied exactly as directed on the bottle or by a physician. 

Delousing can also be practically achieved by boiling all clothes and bedding, or washing them at a high temperature. Leaving the clothes unwashed, but unworn for a full week, also results in the death of lice and eggs.

Where this is not practical or possible, powder dusting with 10% DDT, 1% malathion or 1% permethrin is also effective. Oral ivermectin at a dose of 12 mg on days 0, 7 and 14 has been used in a small trial of 33 people in Marseilles, but did not result in complete eradication, although there was a significant fall in the number of parasites and proportion of people infected. At the moment, ivermectin cannot be routinely recommended for the treatment of body lice.

Medication, insecticide or burning of clothing and bedding is usually not necessary, as the problem normally goes away with daily bathing, and weekly (or more frequent) laundering and drying of clothing, bedding, towels, etc. in a hot clothes drier.

See also
 List of cutaneous conditions
 Pediculosis
 Skin lesion
 Vagabond's leukomelanoderma

References

Arthropod infestations
Lice
Parasitic infestations, stings, and bites of the skin